Marcos Francisco Croce (6 March 1894 – 10 July 1978) was an Argentine footballer who played as goalkeeper. Croce spent most of his career at Racing Club, but he also played in Alumni, Estudiantes BA, and Sportivo Palermo.

Croce is regarded not only as the first great goalkeeper for Racing Club but one of the best in the history of the club.

Biography 
Croce debuted in Alumni with only 16 years old, then moving to C.A. Estudiantes. In 1917 he was transferred to Racing Club, where he had a long tenure also winning 10 titles with the club between 1917 and 1925. Besides, Croce also was one of the first Argentine goalkeeper to kick penalties, scoring several goals.

Between 1920 and 1921, Croce set a record of 1,077 minutes keeping his goal unbeaten (for more than 11 consecutive matches). This record still remains for Argentine Primera División matches. Croce broke the record set by another Racing goalkeeper, Syla Arduino, who had remained 891 minutes unbeaten.

In 1928, Croce (who was playing for Sportivo Palermo) was part of the Capital Federal Combined that played two friendly matches v Scottish side Motherwell F.C. in Buenos Aires. Those exhibition games were scheduled as part of Motherwell tour of South America. Croce's good performances gained him recognition by the press, even appearing on the cover of sports magazine El Gráfico.

Croce retired from football in 1931 playing for Sportivo Palermo. He died on 10 July 1978 at 84 years old.

Internationally, Croce played seven matches for the Argentina national football team. He was also part of Argentina's squad for the 1917 South American Championship, sharing duties with River Plate goalkeeper Carlos Isola.

Titles 
 Primera División (5): 1917, 1918, 1919, 1921, 1925
 Copa Honor MCBA (4): 1912, 1913, 1915, 1917
 Copa Ibarguren (2): 1917, 1918
 Copa Aldao (2): 1917, 1918

References

1894 births
1978 deaths
Argentine footballers
Argentina international footballers
Place of birth missing
Association football goalkeepers